Choghar Chuiyeh (also Romanized as Choghār Chū’īyeh; also known as Chagharchūn, Choghāchū’īyeh, Choghār Chūn, and Jagharchūn) is a village in Bezenjan Rural District, in the Central District of Baft County, Kerman Province, Iran. At the 2006 census, its population was 576, in 119 families.

References 

Populated places in Baft County